Pelecus cultratus, commonly known as the ziege, sichel, sabre carp or sabrefish, is a cyprinid fish species from Eastern Europe and adjacent Asian regions, the only one in its genus, inhabiting the lower reaches of rivers and brackish waters in the eastern Baltic Sea, Black Sea, Caspian Sea and Aral Sea basins. The ziege having no major threats, the IUCN lists it as being of Least Concern.

Description
The ziege resembles a large Baltic herring in appearance. It has a keel on its belly which from the side looks curved while the back is almost straight. It has an upturned snout and the tip of the lower jaw also slopes steeply upwards. The lateral line is wavy and very low down the flank. The pectoral fin is long and pointed. This is a pale, silvery fish with almost colourless fins.

Distribution
The ziege can be found in waters of the Baltic states and Eastern Europe. It can also be found in other European and Asian countries such as Austria, Azerbaijan, Bulgaria, Croatia, Czech Republic, Denmark, Finland, Georgia, Germany, Hungary, Kazakhstan, Moldova, Poland, Romania, Russia, Serbia and Montenegro, Slovakia, Sweden, Turkey, Turkmenistan, Ukraine, and Uzbekistan. It usually swims near the surface in estuaries and lakes and some populations live permanently in rivers and streams.

Biology
This fish feeds on zooplankton, swimming invertebrates such as crustaceans, small fish and floating insects. It breeds in May and June, travelling up-river to find suitable open water locations. It sometimes breeds in brackish water, for example in the Gulf of Finland. The eggs float, and in rivers, drift with the current. They hatch after about three to four days. After spawning, the migratory fish return to estuaries to feed.

References

Leuciscinae
Cyprinid fish of Europe

Fish described in 1758
Taxa named by Carl Linnaeus
Taxonomy articles created by Polbot